Rhaphidopsis melaleuca is a species of beetle in the family Cerambycidae. It was described by Carl Eduard Adolph Gerstaecker in 1855. It is known from Tanzania, Mozambique, Namibia, Malawi, Zambia, South Africa, and Zimbabwe.

Varieties
 Rhaphidopsis melaleuca var. picta (Fåhraeus, 1872)
 Rhaphidopsis melaleuca var. holdhausi Brancsik, 1914

References

Tragocephalini
Beetles described in 1855